Repair Café is an organisation with venues setup to provide people with a place to gather and work on repairing objects of everyday life, such as electronics, mechanical devices, computers, bicycles, and clothing. Repair Cafés are typically held at community locations including churches, libraries, and college campuses where tools are available and device owners can fix their broken goods with the help of volunteers. Repair Café is a part of the grassroots movement that aims to reduce waste, overconsumption, and planned obsolescence. It can re-ignite the do-it-together and "do it yourself" spirit and strengthen social cohesion.

History
Dutch journalist Martine Postma who wants to drive local-level sustainability introduced the Repair Café in Amsterdam, the Netherlands, in 2009 On 18 October 2009, the first Repair Café was held at Fijnhout Theater, Amsterdam-West. On 2 March 2010, the Repair Café Foundation was set up. The foundation was formed to support local groups around the world in setting up their own Repair Cafés. Since then, the number of Repair Cafés has grown quickly. In March 2016 Postma registered more than 1,000 Repair Cafés worldwide, 327 in the Netherlands, 309 in Germany, 22 in the UK, 21 in the US, 15 in Canada, four Australia and one in India. In March 2018 the number of Repair Cafés climbed over 1,500, in 2021 the number reached 2,000.

In 2017, the first International Repair Day was announced. It is intended to be an annual event, taking place on the third Saturday of October each year.

Repair Café and commoning
Repair Café can be understood as an act of commoning.

Repair Café is not only about repairing broken items in a fixed location. It is also about commoning the tools, spaces, knowledge, and skills. For instance, instead of everyone buying their own sewing machine from the market, sharing and commoning the private-owned one would take place in a repair cafe.   In terms of knowledge and skill sharing, the individuals who join the repair cafe workshops are usually happy to help others to repair broken items and teach what they know about repairing as well. They would also make the enclosed knowledge accessible to their members through hacking practices with no regard to the copyright.

Repair Café and the circular economy
Repair Café is a way to avoid consumerism by participating in a circular economy.

Knowledge sharing
In 2017, the Repair Café Foundation developed an online tool—RepairMonitor—enabling volunteers to collect and share knowledge about repair data via the database. In March 2018, information about almost 4,000 repairs had been entered into this system, aiming to promote repairability and durability of products.

3D printing of broken parts

Some Repair Cafés have begun to use 3D printers for replicating broken parts. Broken pieces of domestic appliances may be able to be pieced or glued back together, after which they can be scanned with a 3D scanner. Examples of 3D scanners include David Starter-Kit, 3D Systems Sense, MakerBot Digitizer, Fuel 3D, Microsoft Kinect, and Asus Xtion. Once the physical object is scanned, the 3D model is rendered. It can be converted to a .stl or .obj format and revised using geometry processing software such as makeprintable, netfabb, MeshLab, Meshmixer, Cura, or Slic3r. It is printed using a 3D printer client, creating a physical part using the 3D printer. The complete process takes some time to complete.

To reduce the time needed in the Repair Café, people might choose to use a pre-made part from a website with 3D models (skipping the scanning step), or make the 3D model themselves by taking many photographs of the part and using something like 123D Catch, and/or choose (in the event the Repair Café does not have its own 3D printer) to have the 3D model made in the Repair Café, but printed using a 3D printer elsewhere. Alternatively a 3D printing service like Ponoko, Shapeways, and others can be used, and a person then return to the Repair Café to have the new part fitted to the broken equipment.

Repair Café and degrowth
Repair Café can provide socially and academically insightful notions to degrowth and post-growth paradigm as counter-experiences and practices against capitalism. Despite the fact that some people argue repair does not challenge capitalist economies per-se, yet, the Repair Café has the full potential of creating alternative economies. Repair Café can have impacts on downsizing and slowing down economic inputs and output regarding energy, human capital and environmental materials. It shapes the relationship between producers and users into a non-hierarchical degrowth way and reconnects the users with the means of production. 

Conviviality

The influence of Repair Café is not only on the economic aspects but also on human relationships. Repair Café lower the barriers of technologies and tools and make them more accessible. Do-it-yourself (DIY) is commonly known as individual repair and production without specialized skills and knowledge. Yet, Repair Cafés go beyond the DIY phenomenon and reach a stage that focuses on more sharing and “do-it-together”. Repair Café is a space to reconstruct human relationships based on common interests and through working together. In these situations and places, people have more convivial relationships, which Ivan Illich described as  “individual freedom realized in personal interdependence”. In Illich’s vision, conviviality indicates de-industrialized and creative interactions among people. More broadly, conviviality in the case of Repair Cafés can be understood as spaces with no hierarchy nor domination between individuals as well as spaces where people take care of each other. Thus, conviviality is embodied in the way people share space, knowledge, and tools for creativity and non-marketized activities.

Autonomy and Open Technologies

The movements for increasing repairability seek autonomous and open control on technologies calling for a systematic change of technology production. This challenges the current power-relationships between producers and users. In this sense, some argue that the phenomenon of repair is a counter-power against capitalism and demands for autonomy. The phenomenon of Repair Café and repairability is a critique against industrial modes of production that disempower individuals and the community. Many scholars agree with criticisms claimed by Ivan Illich. Radical monopoly, as Illich calls it, is a mode of industrial production that imposes consumers to buy more products. This is achieved by centralizing the knowledge and information to a limited number of people that are highly specialized in their field. As a result, other options than industrial products are automatically eliminated and people have to rely exclusively on complex industrial tools. The radical monopoly creates dependence on products that people can no longer refuse to use.  Repair Café and repair phenomenon breaks this dependency and enables autonomous choices on products. 
In a degrowth society, the autonomy on what people use, and the relationships between producers and users are essential to enhance autonomy on products as well as being free from the dependency on industrial products that deprive people’s creativity. On the other hand, a degrowth society advocates for autonomy in a sense to depart from exchange value dependency and the current idea of labour which is understood as the creation of exchange values.

See also
 Bicycle cooperative
 Circular economy
 Consumer Rights Act 2015
 Hackerspace
 iFixit
 Library makerspace
 Low technology
 Magnuson–Moss Warranty Act
 Men's shed
 Right to repair
 Sharing economy
 Tool library
 Upcycling

Notes

References

External links 
 
 Repair Café Wiki

Anti-corporate activism
Consumer behaviour
Counterculture
DIY culture
Maintenance
Reuse
Product lifecycle management
Waste minimisation